Abdullahi Amina Dika is a Kenyan Politician from Tana River county. A member of the National Assembly of Kenya. Amina is the Women Representative of Tana River County. It has been six months since she attained the position on the 2022 Kenya general election through the Kenya African National Union Party under the coalition of AZIMIO LA UMOJA Party.

Education and Career 
She has a Diploma from the Institute of Commercial Management from 2002 to 2003. In between 2005 to 2015 she pursued Certificate in Sales & Marketing at the Marriott Learning Center. She also has a Degree in Business Management Sales & Marketing from the East African University.

Amina is skilled on Administrative And Managerial, Excellent Verbal Communication Skills and the Understanding of the Society and culture. She is also interested in Energy, Transport Systems, Public Health care and housing.

Amina was the Nominee of the Ritz-Carlton awards in both 2012 and 2016 Quarters.

From 2008 to 2011, She was a Sales Executive at the Dusit Marina/Princess. She was also a Sales Executive for four years at the Ritz-Carlton, from 2011-2014. An Assistan Sales Manager at the Ritz-Carlton from 2014-2015. Amina was promoted  to be a Group Sales Manager at the Ritz-Carlton in 2015. And in 2020 she was the Operations Manager at the Samua Medicals till 2021.

References 

Kenyan politicians
Year of birth missing (living people)
Living people